List of accounting companies in Kenya. They are regulated by the Institute of Certified Public Accountants of Kenya:

  PwC Kenya
  Deloitte
  KPMG East Africa
  Ernst & Young
  Baker Tilly International
  PKF Eastern Africa
  HLB International
  RSM E.A.
  BDO East Africa
  Grant Thornton
  Crowe Global
  Mazars
  KKCO East Africa LLP

See also
 Kenya Revenue Authority
Banks in Kenya
 Nairobi Securities Exchange
 Economy of Kenya

References

Accounting firms
Accounting firms